Cetronia is a census-designated place (CDP) in South Whitehall Township in Lehigh County, Pennsylvania, located near Allentown. As of the 2020 census, its population was 2,421. Cetronia is part of the Lehigh Valley metropolitan area, which had a population of 861,899 and was the 68th most populous metropolitan area in the U.S. as of the 2020 census.

Geography
Cetronia is in central Lehigh County in the southern part of South Whitehall Township. It is bordered to the north by the Allentown city limits and to the southeast by unincorporated Dorneyville and Dorney Park & Wildwater Kingdom. State Route 1002 (Tilghman Street) runs through Cetronia, Pennsylvania Route 309 forms the western boundary of the community and Cedar Crest Boulevard touches the far eastern end of it.

Interstate 78 runs southwest of Cetronia prior to its merge with PA Route 309. Interstate 476, the Northeast Extension of the Pennsylvania Turnpike, runs just west of Cetronia, separating it from Krocksville, Kuhnsville, and Ruppsville. I-476 has an interchange with US 22 at the western edge of Cetronia, which uses the Allentown ZIP code of 18104.

Cedar Creek, an eastward-flowing tributary of Little Lehigh Creek, forms part of the southern boundary of the CDP. The community is part of the watershed of the Lehigh River, flowing to the Delaware River.

Tilghman Square Shopping Center and a number of restaurants, medical offices, and car dealerships are located in the Cetronia area. The Census Bureau uses 309 and Tilghman Street as the western and northern boundaries of the CDP respectively, however, and therefore most of these businesses are excluded from the CDP definition and totals.

Cetronia Ambulance Corps and the volunteer Cetronia Fire Department provide first responder services to Cetronia and the surrounding area.

References

External links

 Cetronia CDP map

Census-designated places in Lehigh County, Pennsylvania
Census-designated places in Pennsylvania